Neocrania is a genus of moth of the family Eriocraniidae. It contains only one species, Neocrania bifasciata, which is found in the Coast Ranges of southern California.

The wingspan is 8–9 mm for males and 7–10 mm for females. The forewings are pale brownish fuscous with a golden iridescence. The hindwings are slightly darker than the forewings and more fuscous and sometimes with a slight purplish sheen. Adults are on wing in early June in one generation per year.

The larvae feed on Quercus chrysolepis.

References

Eriocraniidae
Moths of North America
Monotypic moth genera